Dasht-e Azadegan County is in Khuzestan province, Iran. The capital of the county is the city of Susangerd. At the 2006 census, the county's population was 126,865 in 22,021 households. The following census in 2011 counted 99,831 people in 22,306 households, by which time Hoveyzeh District had been separated from the county to form Hoveyzeh County. At the 2016 census, Dasht-e Azadegan County's population was 107,989 in 26,558 households. Dasht-e Azadegan means "plain-free," "plain of free," or more precisely "plain of freedom."

Administrative divisions

The population history and structural changes of Dasht-e Azadegan County's administrative divisions over three consecutive censuses are shown in the following table. The latest census shows two districts, five rural districts, and four cities.

References

 

Counties of Khuzestan Province